The ZIL-41047 is a limousine built by ZIL of Russia. Production of ZIL models ceased in 2002 due to their previous customer base turning to more modern Western vehicles. Some last ones were built before year 2017.

Description

The Zil has seven seats including the driver. When loaded it weighs . The top speed with two persons is listed as "not less than 190 km/h (118 mph)". It is powered by a 7.7 L (469 cubic inch) carbureted V8 giving 232 kW (315 hp SAE Gross) at 4,400 revs per minute. This engine drives the rear wheels via a three-speed automatic transmission with the following ratios.

 First gear: 2.02:1
 Second gear: 1.42:1
 Third gear: 1:1
 Reverse: 1.42:1

It replaced the ZIL-4104 in 1985 and had virtually no mechanical changes compared with that model. The only major changes have been in the styling, which in some respects, notably in the rear-view mirrors, was subtly modernised compared to the styling of previous ZIL models. The front turn indicators were also modernised, with the rectangular horizontal line giving way to a more vertically oriented, door-like shape. The front headlights were also restyled, as was the rear parcel shelf.

Variants
 ZIL-41047 (1985—2002) — base model with seven seats and 3880-mm (152.75 inches) wheelbase
 ZIL-41041 (1986—2000) — five-seat saloon, 3300-mm (130 inches) wheelbase. 30 made, 12 of them in 1997-2000 for the Government of Moscow, 4 in mid 2010s for sale.
 ZIL-41042 — ambulance
 ZIL-41044 — convertible
 ZIL-41049 — special communication car
 ZIL-41052 (1988—2002) — armoured limousine
 ZIL-4107 (1988—1999) — special communication car
 ZIL-41071 — special communication car
 ZIL-41072 «Скорпион» "Scorpion"(1989—1999) — an escort car
 ZIL-4104R (1990) — film car
 ZIL-41047TB (1992) — limousine with Trasco Bremen armouring (2 cars made)
 ZIL-410441 (2010) — 3 cars in black for the Victory Day parade on Red Square

References

External links
 —Official MSTS6 ZIL website

41047
Luxury vehicles
Flagship vehicles
Limousines
Soviet automobiles
Cars of Russia
Cars introduced in 1985
1990s cars
2000s cars